The Army of India between 1903 and 1947 consisted of the British Indian Army and the British Army in India. 

Lord Kitchener was appointed Commander-in-Chief of India between 1902 and 1909. He instituted large-scale reforms of the military units in the British Raj in India, including merging the three armies of the three presidencies into a unified force and forming higher level formations, eight army divisions, and brigading Indian and British units. Following Kitchener's reforms:
The Indian Army was "the force recruited locally and permanently based in India, together with its expatriate British officers".
The British Army in India consisted of British Army units posted to India for a tour of duty, and which would then be posted to other parts of the Empire or back to the United Kingdom.
The Indian Army and the British Army in India were grouped together as the Army of India.

During the Second World War, after the fall of Singapore and the ending of ABDACOM in early 1942, until the formation of South East Asia Command (SEAC) in August 1943, some American and Chinese units were placed under the Army of India command. 

The officer commanding the Army of India was the Commander-in-Chief in India who reported to the civilian Governor-General. His command was known as India Command and his staff were based at GHQ India.

Notes

References

Military of British India
1903 in India
Military history of India during World War II